Golden Bowl may refer to:

The Golden Bowl, a 1904 novel by Henry James
The Golden Bowl (Manfred), a 1944 novel by Frederick Manfred
The Golden Bowl (TV series), a 1972 BBC series adapted from James's novel
The Golden Bowl (film), a 2000 film adapted from James's novel
Goldenbowl lily, a member of the genus Calochortus

See also
Golden bowl of Hasanlu, an ancient artefact from Iran